Tails Creek is an unincorporated area in Gilmer County, in the U.S. state of Georgia.

History
A post office called Tail's Creek was established in 1849, and remained in operation until 1940. The community took its name from the nearby stream Tails Creek. A variant spelling is "Tailscreek".

References

Unincorporated communities in Georgia (U.S. state)
Unincorporated communities in Gilmer County, Georgia